Konstantinos Panageas (also spelled Constantinos, born 11 August 1949) is a Greek sports shooter. He competed in two events at the 1988 Summer Olympics.

References

External links
 
 

1949 births
Living people
Greek male sport shooters
Olympic shooters of Greece
Shooters at the 1988 Summer Olympics
Place of birth missing (living people)
20th-century Greek people